Kidderminster College is a post 16 Comprehensive College in Kidderminster, England providing full and part-time adult education. The College offers courses which specialise in hairdressing, engineering, creative industries, business administration, and construction, and collaborates closely  with local  employers on Skillfast, Train to Gain, and Goskills programmes.

History 
In  2009, around 140 pupils aged 14 to 18 from other local schools were also following vocational courses at the college.  In 2003 the college moved from the Hoo Road site to its new town centre campus, and also operates outreach centres on Kidderminster and the surrounding Wyre Forest area. In 2018, Ofsted rated the college with Grade 3 (requires improvement) for its overall  performance.

In August 2014, Kidderminster College merged with NCG. It is now one of four colleges within NCG.

In June 2018 Ofsted rated the group that owns Kidderminster College, (NCG) as requires improvement.

References

Further education colleges in Worcestershire
Buildings and structures in Kidderminster